Tunicatimonas is a genus from the family of Flammeovirgaceae with one known species (Tunicatimonas pelagia).

References

Further reading 
 

Cytophagia
Bacteria genera
Monotypic bacteria genera